This is a list of the oldest surviving buildings and structures of significance in each province and territory of Canada.

Alberta

First Nations peoples in Alberta were generally nomadic and did not create permanent structures, however they did often occupy the same site annually for many generations, and created permanent markers in the form of tipi rings and medicine wheels. The first Europeans to build in Alberta were the fur traders of the North West Company who constructed the first trading posts in Alberta at Fort Chipewyan and Fort Vermilion in 1788.  Few buildings from the fur trade era remain.

There is said to be 25 buildings built prior to 1882 still surviving in Alberta. Most buildings considered "historic" in Alberta are from the post-railway era (e.g. after 1885 in Calgary, after 1891 in Edmonton).

The following is a list of oldest buildings and structures in Alberta constructed prior to 1900.

British Columbia

The following is a list of oldest buildings and structures in British Columbia constructed prior to 1900.

Manitoba
The following is a list of buildings and structures in Manitoba constructed prior to 1900.

New Brunswick
Before 1784, New Brunswick was part of the colony of Nova Scotia and the majority of the population was aboriginal. The native populations of the land that is now New Brunswick were a nomadic people and thus there are few remains of their settlements. However, in 1784 New Brunswick became its own colony due to an increasingly non-aboriginal population. The area was mostly forest until United Empire Loyalists started to arrive, and European-style buildings were not constructed for the most part until after their arrival. Many Acadian homes and settlements were destroyed by the British during the expulsion of the Acadians known as the Great Expulsion from 1755 to 1763. Acadians were a people of French descent who lived in New Brunswick, Prince Edward Island and Nova Scotia for over a century before the British took over the lands that were New France. After the expulsion there was a short wave of settlement by a peoples known as the New England Planters. They were a small group without a lot of remaining architecture.

The following is a list of oldest buildings and structures in New Brunswick constructed prior to 1890.

Newfoundland and Labrador
The following is a list of oldest buildings and structures in Newfoundland and Labrador constructed prior to 1860.

Northwest Territories

Nova Scotia
The following is a list of oldest buildings and structures in Nova Scotia constructed prior to 1830.

Nunavut
The following is a list of oldest buildings and structures in Nunavut constructed prior to 1960.

Ontario

The following is a list of oldest buildings and structures in Ontario constructed prior to 1830, excluding the cities of Markham, Toronto, and the Region of Waterloo.

Prince Edward Island 
The following is a list of oldest buildings and structures in Prince Edward Island constructed prior to 1860.

Quebec

The first Europeans to arrive in Quebec were settlers from France. They founded Quebec City in 1608 and erected there the first foundations such as the Habitation made of wood and set up by Samuel de Champlain. Despite the founding of other significant settlements in New France in the 17th century, notably Trois-Rivières in 1634 and Montreal in 1642, there are only a few 17th-century buildings that still survive outside the Capitale-Nationale region. Therefore, the oldest buildings still standing in Quebec are found heavily in and around Quebec City. All such buildings date from the French regime and are protected as historical monuments under the law enforced by the Ministry of Culture and Communication of Quebec.

The following is a list of old buildings and structures in Quebec constructed prior to 1750.

Saskatchewan
The following  is a list of oldest buildings and structures in Saskatchewan constructed prior to 1900.

Yukon
The following  is a list of oldest buildings and structures in Yukon constructed prior to 1900.

See also 
 Architecture of Canada
 List of heritage buildings in Vancouver
 List of oldest buildings and structures in Halifax, Nova Scotia
 List of oldest buildings and structures in Toronto
 Gothic Revival architecture in Canada

References

"Architecture in Canada" The Canadian Encyclopedia
Kalman, Harold D. A History of Canadian Architecture. Toronto: Oxford University Press, 1994.
Canada by Design: Parliament Hill, Ottawa at Library and Archives Canada
 Baker, Marilyn, Manitoba's Third Legislative Building: Symbol in Stone:The Art and Politics of a Public Building, Hyperion Press, Winnipeg, Manitoba  1986
 Cameron, Stanley, Stones of History: Canada's Houses of Parliament, Film Board of Canada
 Denby & Kilbourn, Toronto Observed: Its Architecture, Patrons, and History,Oxford University Press, Toronto  1986
 Edwards, Gregory, Hidden Cities: Art & Design in Architectural Details of Vancouver & Victoria, Talonbooks, Vancouver, BC  1991.
 Emporis.com
 Kalman, Phillips and Ward, Exploring Vancouver: The Essential Architectural Guide, UBC Press, Vancouver  1993
 Kvaran, Einar Einarsson, Architectural Sculpture in America, unpublished manuscript
 Maitland, Hucker & Ricketts, A Guide to Canadian Architectural Styles, broadview press, Peterborough, ON  1992
 McHugh, Patricia, Toronto Architecture: A City Guide, McClelland & Stewart Inc., Toronto  1989
 McMullen, Barbara, Ottawa's Terra Cotta Architecture: Two Walking Tours, Heritage Ottawa, Ottawa,  2003
 skyscraperpage.com
 Taggart, Jim, The Architecture of Downtown Victoria, Blue Steps - Pacific Walking Tour Guides, Vancouver, BC  2000
 The Notman Photographic Archives.

External links
 Biographical Dictionary of Architects in Canada,  – biographies of Canadian architects and lists of their buildings from 1800 to 1950.